The Nguyen Thien Thuat apartment buildings (Vietnamese: Chung cư Nguyễn Thiện Thuật) are a complex of American-built historic buildings in District 3, Ho Chi Minh City. The apartments are located on Nguyen Thien Thuat street, a thoroughfare known for its musical instrument shops.

Constructed in 1968 in the aftermath of the Tet Offensive, the apartments originally housed soldiers serving in the US military during the Vietnam War. The apartments are adjacent to Ban Co Market on Nguyen Dinh Chieu street, a large wet market. The area is considered a haven for street food, and is a popular destination for food tours. In 2021, the Ho Chi Minh City government proposed demolishing the apartments, which it described as "seriously deteriorated".

References 

Buildings and structures in Ho Chi Minh City
History of Ho Chi Minh City
Tourist attractions in Ho Chi Minh City